Glycine/sarcosine N-methyltransferase (ApGSMT, glycine-sarcosine methyltransferase, GSMT, GMT, glycine sarcosine N-methyltransferase, S-adenosyl-L-methionine:sarcosine N-methyltransferase) is an enzyme with systematic name S-adenosyl-L-methionine:glycine(or sarcosine) N-methyltransferase (sarcosine(or N,N-dimethylglycine)-forming). This enzyme catalyses the following chemical reaction

 2 S-adenosyl-L-methionine + glycine  2 S-adenosyl-L-homocysteine + N,N-dimethylglycine (overall reaction)
(1a) S-adenosyl-L-methionine + glycine  S-adenosyl-L-homocysteine + sarcosine
(1b) S-adenosyl-L-methionine + sarcosine  S-adenosyl-L-homocysteine + N,N-dimethylglycine

This enzyme participates in biosynthesis of betaine from glycine in cyanobacterium Aphanocthece halophytica.

References

External links 
 

EC 2.1.1